Ye Olde Cherry Tree is a grade II listed public house on the corner of The Green and The Mall in Southgate, north London, which dates from around 1695.

History
The Cherry Tree was built around 1695. It has since been altered and extended and is composed of a variety of materials which date from the 17th to the 19th centuries. It is grade II listed with Historic England.

The first landlord was Edward Lomas. It was known for its skittles alley and was the meeting place for several friendly societies, including the Loyal Britain society, which met there from 1800 to 1833.

Southgate's football club (founded c. 1883) played on the field behind the pub.

Telephone kiosk

Nearby is a grade II listed K6 telephone kiosk designed in 1935 by Sir Giles Gilbert Scott.

See also
 List of pubs in London

References

External links 

Pubs in the London Borough of Enfield
Grade II listed pubs in London
Grade II listed buildings in the London Borough of Enfield
Southgate, London